Highway 58 (AR 58, Ark. 58, and Hwy. 58) is an east–west state highway in north central Arkansas. The route of  begins at Highway 14 and runs east to US Highway 67 (US 67) in Donaldson. There is also an alternate route of  designated as Highway 58E near Williford. Both routes are maintained by the Arkansas State Highway and Transportation Department (AHTD).

Route description
AR 58 begins at AR 14 and runs north, crossing the White River and Guion. It continues north until meeting AR 69 south of Sage. The route continues east to Maxville, where it meets US 167. AR 58 concurs with US 167 until Cave City, when it begins to head northeast with AR 115. After leaving the AR 115 concurrency, the route heads due north to Poughkeepsie, where it passes the Poughkeepsie School Building and Little Springs Missionary Baptist Church, both listed on the National Register of Historic Places. Highway 58 serves as the eastern terminus for Highway 56. AR 58 continues north to meet AR 354 before heading to Williford. In Williford, AR 58 splits into two routes, with the alternate route being designated AR 58E. The main route continues north to terminate at US 62/US 63/US 412.

History
Highway 58 was created during the 1926 Arkansas state highway numbering as a route between State Road 69 and US 62/US 63 at Williford.

Major intersections
Mile markers reset at concurrencies.

Alternate route

Highway 58E (AR 58E, Ark. 58E, and Hwy. 58E) is an east–west state highway alternate route in Sharp County. The route of  begins at Highway 58 and runs east to US 62/US 63/US 412.

Route description

Highway 58E begins at its parent route in Williford and runs east as Main Street. The route runs roughly parallel to the Spring River before turning north to intersect US 62/US 63/US 412, where it terminates.

History
Highway 58E is a portion of the original 1926 routing of US 62/US 63 through the area.

Major intersections

See also

 List of state highways in Arkansas

References

External links

058
Transportation in Stone County, Arkansas
Transportation in Izard County, Arkansas
Transportation in Sharp County, Arkansas